Cornel Nemţoc (born 8 February 1974 in Rădăuți) is a Romanian rower.

References 
 
 

1974 births
Living people
Romanian male rowers
People from Rădăuți
Olympic rowers of Romania
Rowers at the 1996 Summer Olympics
Rowers at the 2000 Summer Olympics
World Rowing Championships medalists for Romania